The Godfrey M. Bockius House (better known locally as the Bockius - Orr House) is an  Italianate—Victorian style house in a historic district

in Watsonville, California. It was built in 1870  by Judge Godfrey M. Bockius, and was inhabited later by descendant Frank F. Orr, former editor of the Register-Pajaronian. Today the historical district contains the house itself, headquarters of the Pajaro Valley Historical Association and on the National Register of Historic Places, along with the Volck Museum and Alzora Snyder Archive.

Godfrey M. Bockius
Judge Bockius was one of the prominent early leaders in the development of agriculture in the Pajaro Valley and in city government and commerce in the City of Watsonville. He was a judge in Santa Cruz County, California from 1858 to 1862. In 1868, Watsonville was incorporated and Judge Bockius served as Chairman of the first Board of Trustees of the city. In 1871, he was elected to the California State Assembly.

Frank F. Orr
Frank Orr, the last of four generations to inhabit the house, was editor of the Register Pajaronian newspaper which won a 1956 Pulitzer Prize in Public Service for his and others investigative reporting into a corrupt County District Attorney's involvement in gambling. The Alzora Snyder Archive includes numerous formerly classified photos from Mr. Orr's collection gathered during his service as Director of Still Picture Operations  in the US Army Signal Corps during World War II, where he obtained the rank of captain.

References

External links

History of Santa Cruz County, California
History of the Monterey Bay Area
Houses on the National Register of Historic Places in California
Houses on the National Register of Historic Places in Santa Cruz County, California
Houses in Santa Cruz County, California
Italianate architecture in California
Victorian architecture in California
Museums in Santa Cruz County, California
Historic districts on the National Register of Historic Places in California
National Register of Historic Places in Santa Cruz County, California